Imogen Clark may refer to: 

 Imogen Clark (swimmer) (born 1999), British swimmer
 Imogen Clark (writer) (?–1936), American novelist and poet